Odunlade Adekola , (born 31 December 1976) is a Nigerian actor, singer, film-maker, film producer and film director. He gained popularity and was widely known for his lead role in Ishola Durojaye's 2003 movie, Asiri Gomina Wa, and has acted in many Nollywood movies since then. He is the founder and CEO of the Odunlade Adekola Film Production (OAFP).

Early life
Adekola was born and raised in Abeokuta, Ogun State, and he is a native of Otun Ekiti, Ekiti State.

Education 
Odunlade Adekola attended St John's Primary School and St. Peter's College in Abeokuta, Ogun State and then obtaining the West African School Certificate Examination before he proceeded to Moshood Abiola Polytechnic,(MAPOLY) where he received a diploma certificate. Odunlade proceeded to further his education and in May 2018, he received a degree in Bachelors of Business Administration at the University of Lagos.

Career
Odunlade Adekola began his acting career in 1996, the same year he joined the Association of Nigeria Theatre Arts practitioners. He has starred in, scripted, produced and directed several Nigerian films also known as Nollywood over the years. In April 2014, Adekola won the Africa Movie Academy Award for the best actor of the year. In December 2015, he marked his entrance into the Nigerian music industry. Photographs of Odunlade during filming are widely used as internet memes across the Nigerian websphere.
On the 17th of September, 2018, Odunlade Adekola became the brand ambassador for RevolutionPlus Property Development Company. It was indeed a remarkable day for him. He was officially unveiled as the company's Brand ambassador at their Ikeja office in Lagos. Odunlade Adekola is a brand ambassador to several organizations such as Goldberg beer and Globacom Telecommunications

Personal life 
He married Ruth Adekola in 2003, and has four children.

Filmography
 President Kuti
"Ile Afoju (2019)"
The Vendor (2018)
Alani pamolekun (2015)
Asiri Gomina Wa (2003)
Mufu Olosa Oko (2013)
Kabi O Osi  (2014)
Oyenusi (2014)
Sunday Dagboru  (2010)
Monday Omo Adugbo(2010)
Emi Nire Kan (2009)
Eje Tutu (2015)
Ma ko fun E (2014)
Gbolahan (2015)
Oju Eni Mala (2015)
Kurukuru (2015)
Olosha  (2015)
Omo Colonel  (2015)
Aroba(2015) 
Oro (2015)
Baleku (2015) 
Babatunde Ishola Folorunsho(2015) 
Adebayo Aremu Abere (2015)
Adajo Agba (2015)
Oyun Esin(2015)
Taxi Driver: Oko Ashewo (2015)
Samu Alajo(2017)
Shola Arikusa (film)
Sunday gboku gboku (2016)
Abi eri re fo ni (2016)
Igbesemi (2016)
Lawonloju (2016)
Pepeye Meje (2016)
Asiri Ikoko (2016)
Pate Pate (2017)
Adura (2017)
Ere Mi (2017)
Okan Oloore (2017)
Ota (2017)
Owiwi (2017)
Agbara Emi (2017)
Critical Evidence (2017)
Olowori (2017)
Iku Lokunrin (2017)
Eku Meji (2017)
Yeye Alara (2018) as Dongari
Ado Agbara (2019)
Agbaje Omo Onile 1, 2, 3
Omo Germany (2018)
Gbemileke 1,2,3 (2019)
Sammu Alajo Comedy series (2020–Present)
The Miracle Centre (2020)
President Kuti (2021)
 Ajibade (In Cinemas, December 2021)
King of Thieves (In Cinemas, April 2022)
Elesin Oba, The King's Horseman (September 2022)

Awards and nominations

See also
List of Yoruba people
List of Nigerian actors

References

Living people
Nigerian male film actors
Male actors from Abeokuta
Male actors in Yoruba cinema
Yoruba male actors
21st-century Nigerian male actors
Moshood Abiola Polytechnic alumni
University of Lagos alumni
Yoruba filmmakers
Yoruba-language film directors
Entertainers from Ekiti State
1976 births
Nigerian film producers
Nigerian male singers
Nigerian chief executives